This is a list of the members of the 8th Seanad Éireann, the upper house of the Oireachtas (legislature) of Ireland. These Senators were elected or appointed in 1954, after the 1954 general election and served until the close of poll for the 9th Seanad in 1957.

Composition of the 8th Seanad
There are a total of 60 seats in the Seanad. 43 Senators are elected by the Vocational panels, 6 elected by the Universities and 11 are nominated by the Taoiseach.

The following table shows the composition by party when the 8th Seanad first met on 22 July 1954.

List of senators

Changes

See also
Members of the 15th Dáil
Government of the 15th Dáil

References

External links

 
08